Colmar station (French: Gare de Colmar) is a railway station located in Colmar, in the Haut-Rhin département of Alsace, France. The same design was used in the construction of Gdansk's principal railway station in Poland.  Thus the buildings are 'twins' of one another.

Services

The following train services serve the station as of 2022:
TGV
 Line Paris-Est - Strasbourg - Colmar
 Line Luxembourg - Strasbourg - Besançon - Lyon - Marseille/Montpellier
TER Grand Est
 Line Strasbourg - Mulhouse - Basel
 Line Colmar - Turckheim - Munster - Metzeral

Traffic
More than 3 million passengers pass through the gare de Colmar per year.

Other stations
 Gare aux marchandises de Colmar: goods station
 Gare de Colmar-Mésanges: halt
 Gare de Colmar-Saint-Joseph: halt
 Gare de Colmar-Sud: closed

References

Buildings and structures in Colmar
Railway stations in Haut-Rhin
Railway stations in France opened in 1907
Colmar